The Baure people are an ethnic group who live in the Beni Department of Bolivia. There were 3,328 of them according to the 2012 census of which 58 spoke the Baure language natively.

References

Ethnic groups in Bolivia